The following is a list of events and releases that happened in 2023 in African music.

Events
January 11 – It is announced by Nhanhla Sibisi, head of the Recording Industry of South Africa (RiSA) that the 29th edition of the South African Music Awards will begin accepting entries in the first quarter of 2023.

Deaths
February 8 – Dennis Lotis, 97, South African-born singer
February 10 – AKA, 35, South African rapper
February 25 – Ismaïla Touré, 73, Senegalese musician  and co-founder of Touré Kunda)

See also 
 2023 in music

References 

Africa
African music
African music